Zakharenko (from the given names Захар, Захарий/Захарій or Захария/Захарія – all East Slavic variants of the Hebrew name Zechariah – by adding the (primarily Ukrainian) Slavic diminutive suffix -енко (-enko)
with the meaning "young", "small", "son of") is a Belarusian, Ukrainian and Russian masculine surname. It may refer to
 Andrei Zakharenko (born 1979), Russian footballer
 Natalie Zakharenko (1938–1981), birth name of American film and television actress Natalie Wood
 Yury Zakharenko (1952 – 1999 (?)), Belarusian minister of internal affairs

See also
Zakharenkov
Zakharchenko

References 

Russian-language surnames
Belarusian-language surnames
Ukrainian-language surnames
Surnames from given names